Bajza utca (Bajza street) is a station of the yellow M1 (Millennium Underground) line of the Budapest Metro. The station was opened on 2 May 1896 as part of the inaugural section of the Budapest Metro, between Vörösmarty tér and Széchenyi fürdő. This section, known as the Millennium Underground Railway, was the first mostro system in continental Europe. In 2002, it was included into the World Heritage Site "Budapest, including the Banks of the Danube, the Buda Castle Quarter and Andrássy Avenue".

Connection
Bus: 105, 178

References

M1 (Budapest Metro) stations
Railway stations opened in 1896